Where I Started is the third studio album by Canadian rock band Wide Mouth Mason.  The album produced four successful singles, "Why", "Companion (Lay Me Down)", "Sugarcane", and "Half A Chance". The album won the award for "Outstanding Rock Recording" at the 1999 Prairie Music Awards. The album was certified Gold in Canada in December 2002. A live version of the song "King Of Poison" was featured on MuchMusic's live compilation album, Much at Edgefest '99.

Track listing
 Why - 2:57
 Alone - 3:01 
 Burn - 4:48
 Companion (Lay Me Down) - 3:01
 Half A Chance - 4:06
 Empty Seat - 4:06 
 Crystal Ball - 4:03
 King Of Poison - 3:20
 Sugarcane - 4:25
 Where I Started - 5:07 
 Old - 3:46  
 Falling Down - 4:45

References

1999 albums
Wide Mouth Mason albums
Albums produced by David Leonard (record producer)
Albums recorded at Greenhouse Studios